Elivaldogene autotemcel, sold under the brand name Skysona, is a gene therapy used to treat cerebral adrenoleukodystrophy (CALD). It is being developed by Bluebird bio.

Elivaldogene autotemcel is made specifically for each recipient, using the recipient's hematopoietic stem cells.

History 
Elivaldogene autotemcel was designated an orphan drug by the European Medicines Agency (EMA) in 2012.

Elivaldogene autotemcel was granted orphan drug, rare pediatric disease, and breakthrough therapy designations by the U.S. Food and Drug Administration (FDA).  In September 2022, elivaldogene autotemcel was granted accelerated approval.

On 20 May 2021, the Committee for Medicinal Products for Human Use (CHMP) of the European Medicines Agency (EMA) recommended the granting of a marketing authorization for elivaldogene autotemcel. The applicant was Bluebird Bio (Netherlands) B.V. In July 2021, the European Commission approved elivaldogene autotemcel under the tradename Skysona for CALD patients who have certain genetic mutations and don't have a sibling who is a match for a stem cell transplant.

Society and culture

Names 
Elivaldogene autotemcel is the recommended international nonproprietary name (INN).

References

Further reading 
 

Breakthrough therapy
Gene therapy
Orphan drugs